WMSR-FM (94.9 MHz) is a radio station licensed to Collinwood, Tennessee.  It is part of the Florence/Muscle Shoals, Alabama, radio market and is owned and operated by Singing River Media Group, LLC.

History
WMSR-FM began as country WTNR-FM, simulcasting WTNR from Waynesboro, Tennessee. WTNR-FM changed callsigns to WFRQ on May 7, 1994. It changed callsigns again on September 8, 1998, taking the current WMSR-FM.
As of August 30, 2013, the station flipped from contemporary hit radio (CHR) to adult album alternative (AAA), keeping the "Star" name.

Most of the airstaff remained following the format adjustments.  The station retained the popular Kidd Kraddick in the Morning Program.

On November 2, 2015, WMSR rebranded as "94.9 The X".

In late March 2018, WMSR-FM changed their format from adult album alternative to urban contemporary, branded as "Power 94.9".

On April 26, 2019, WMSR-FM changed their format from urban contemporary to country, branded as "94.9 The Bull".

Former logo

References

External links
WMSR-FM official website

Country radio stations in the United States
MSR-FM
Radio stations established in 1991
1991 establishments in Tennessee